Highfield is a surname. Notable people with the surname include:

Adam Highfield (born 1981), New Zealand footballer
Arnold R. Highfield (born 1940), American academic, historian, writer and poet
Ashley Highfield, British newspaper publisher
Liam Highfield (born 1990), English snooker player
Roger Highfield (born 1958), Welsh writer and museum executive